List of largest optical reflecting telescopes - List of large optical telescopes
 List of largest optical refracting telescopes
 List of space telescopes
 List of solar telescopes
 List of telescope types
 List of largest optical telescopes historically
 List of largest optical telescopes in the 20th century
 List of largest optical telescopes in the 19th century
 List of largest optical telescopes in the 18th century

See also
 Lists of telescopes

Optical telescopes